Avraham Nudelman was an Israeli footballer who played for Hapoel Tel Aviv and Mandatory Palestine national football team during the British Mandate era.

Playing career
Nudelman was born in Menashiya neighborhood of Jaffa in 1910, and started playing football with local youth club Allenby Tel Aviv, which was initially affiliated with Maccabi Tel Aviv, but its members decided to withdraw from Maccabi, due to the professional attitude towards sports and merged in 1927 with Hapoel Tel Aviv. With Hapoel, Nudelman stayed until 1938, when he retired from football in favor of his day job as a worker in Tel Aviv Harbor. Nudelman won 3 championships and 4 cups, scoring goals in the 1928 and 1938 cup finals.
Nudelman was also part of the Mandatory Palestine national football team, and played three matches for the team, two against Egypt in 1934, scoring the consolation goal for Mandatory Palestine in a 1–7 defeat, and one against Greece in 1938, after which he retired from the national team.

Personal life
During World War II, Nudelman was drafted to the British Army, where he served as a driver. After the 1948 Arab–Israeli War, Nudelman was given a work as a chauffeur in the Ministry of Defense and played for the ministry's football team.

Honours
League Championships (3):
 1933–34, 1934–35, 1937–38
Cup (4):
1928, 1934, 1937, 1938

External links
Avraham Nudelman Hapoel Wiki 
Nucha: The Cup Is Mine Ya'akov Bar-On, Hadshot HaSport, 18 October 1967, via wiki.red-fans.com 
Football and Merriment in… Beirut Pinchas Zahavi, Hadshot HaSport, 10 April 1970, via wiki.red-fans.com

References

1910 births
1985 deaths
20th-century Israeli Jews
Jews in Ottoman Palestine
Jews in Mandatory Palestine
Israeli footballers
Mandatory Palestine footballers
Hapoel Tel Aviv F.C. players
Hapoel Ramat Gan F.C. managers
Footballers from Jaffa
Association football wingers
Israeli football managers
Mandatory Palestine international footballers